Yoo Je-yoon is a South Korean actor, model and singer. He is known for his role in movies such as Gonjiam: Haunted Asylum, Extreme Job, and A Hunting Hitchhike.

Filmography

Film

Discography

Albums

References

External links 
 
 
 
 

1984 births
Living people
21st-century South Korean male actors
Korea National University of Arts alumni
South Korean male models
South Korean male film actors
South Korean male singers